Charles Alonzo Burns  (January 3, 1863 – December 31, 1930) was a Massachusetts, USA, businessman and politician who served on the Board of Aldermen and as the fifteenth mayor of Somerville, Massachusetts.

Biography
Burns was born on January 3, 1863, in Wilton, New Hampshire to Charles Henry and Sarah Naomi (Mills) Burns.

Burns attended St Paul's School in Concord, New Hampshire, and Chauncey Hall School in Boston, from which he graduated in 1881.

Burns was married to Lulie C. Jones. They had three children: Robert A., Charles Henry and Elizabeth. Lulie Burns died on August 25, 1896.

Burns first entered into the business of manufacturing cotton yarn in Wilton. He later managed soapstone quarries in Chester, Vermont, and in Virginia, and in 1893 moved to Somerville where he worked as the president of the Union Soapstone Co.

In 1927, Burns moved to Winchester, Massachusetts. He died there on December 31, 1930.

Notes

1863 births
St. Paul's School (New Hampshire) alumni
Mayors of Somerville, Massachusetts
People from Wilton, New Hampshire
Massachusetts city council members
1930 deaths
Massachusetts Republicans